Udo Reichl (born 22 October 1959, in Kaufbeuren)  a German bioengineer, is leader of the Research Group Bioprocess Engineering at the Max Planck Institute for Dynamics of Complex Technical Systems in Magdeburg and Chair of Bioprocess Engineering at the Otto-von-Guericke University Magdeburg.

Education & professional career  
Reichl studied biology at Saarland University, Germany, and Chemical Engineering at Stuttgart University, where he gained his PhD at the Institute for Systems Dynamic and Control. After holding several postdoc positions he became head of virus productions at Pitman-Moore GmbH in Burgwedel near Hanover, Germany. Since 1999 he has held the Chair of Bioprocess Engineering at the Otto-von-Guericke University Magdeburg, and he was appointed Director at the MPI for the Dynamics of Complex Technical Systems in 2000.

Major research interests  
His major research interests are  the optimization and scale-up of viral-based production processes, chromatographic methods, chromatographic methods for purification of viral antigen, mathematical modeling, monitoring and control of bioprocesses and cellular systems, including quantitative analysis of cellular metabolic and regulation networks and proteomics, particularly the characterization of protein structures involved in glycosylation.

Awards, honors & memberships (selection)

Publications (selection) 
List of Publications

External links 
Profile at the Otto-von-Guericke University Magdeburg

References 

1959 births
Living people
German bioengineers
People from Kaufbeuren
Engineers from Bavaria
Academic staff of Otto von Guericke University Magdeburg
Saarland University alumni
Max Planck Institute directors